William Shanahan (22 March 1897 – 29 May 1954) was an Irish athlete. He competed in the men's decathlon at the 1924 Summer Olympics.

References

External links
 

1897 births
1954 deaths
Athletes (track and field) at the 1924 Summer Olympics
Irish decathletes
Olympic athletes of Ireland
People from County Tipperary
Olympic decathletes